Sons of the Seas (1926), is a silent film which is mostly known for being the first film filmed in Malta in 1925. The major reason why this and three other films from the interwar era were filmed on Malta was because of the presence of the Admiralty there. The fictitious Sons of the Sea tells the tale of two young men who join the Navy. The film is archived at the British Film Institute, where only four out of six films remain. The film was set to be screened by both the Malta Film Commission and Heritage Malta

References 

1926 films
Silent films
Films shot in Malta